The Surface Pro 7 is a 2-in-1 detachable tablet computer developed by Microsoft. It is the seventh generation of Surface Pro and was announced alongside the Surface Laptop 3 and Surface Pro X at an event on 2 October 2019. An updated version of the device was introduced on the 11th of January 2021 called the Surface Pro 7+. Surface Pro 7 and 7+ maintain the same form and design as previous models but with the Mini DisplayPort receptacle replaced by a USB-C port. The display of the device is the same as the previous model with a 2736 x 1824 resolution touchscreen in 3:2 aspect ratio and 267 ppi. The Surface Pro 7 starts at $750 and goes up to $2,300. The Surface Pro 7+ for Business starts at $900 and goes up to $2,800.

Microsoft started offering the Surface Pro 7+ to consumers as announced at their Surface Event on September 22, 2021.

Hardware 

 The Surface Pro 7 is the 7th addition to Surface Pro lineup. The tablet is aimed towards professionals while the Surface Pro 7+ an updated version aimed towards the enterprise.
 The Surface Pro 7+ comes with a removable SSD while the Surface Pro 7 does not.
 Both are available with a 12.3-inch LCD touchscreen display and features a full-body magnesium alloy construction in platinum and black finish.
 The device is the first Surface Pro to contain a USB-C port with power delivery.
 The kickstand is still present just like previous models and unfolds from 0 degrees to 165 degrees.
 The Surface Pro 7 includes 1 USB-C port, 1 USB A port, 1 3.5 mm audio port, 1 microSD card port (non-LTE models), and a Surface Connect port.
 The Surface Pro 7 size is 11.5 x 7.9 x 0.33 inches and weighs ~1.7 pounds.
 The Surface Pro 7's battery is 43.2Wh which offers battery life of ~8 hours. The Surface Pro 7+ for Business battery is 50.4Wh for even longer life.

Software 

Surface Pro 7+ for Business models ship with a pre-installed 64-bit version of Windows 10 Pro; consumer models ship with a pre-installed 64-bit version of Windows 10 Home. Windows 10 comes pre-installed with Mail, Calendar, People, Xbox, Photos, Movies and TV, Groove, Your Phone, a 30-day trial of Office 365, and the Edge browser. The device also supports Windows Hello login using biometric facial recognition.

Configuration

 Consumer models come preloaded with Windows 10 HomeBusiness models come preloaded with Windows 10 Pro

Timeline

References

Microsoft Surface
2-in-1 PCs